Orania is a town in South Africa.

Orania may also refer to:
 Orania (plant), a genus of palm trees
 Orania (gastropod), a genus of molluscs
 Orania Papazoglou, American mystery writer

See also
 Oranje (disambiguation), a homophone of Orania
 Urania (disambiguation)